Crell is a surname. Notable people with the surname include:

Jan Crell or Johannes Crellius (1590–1633), Polish and German theologian
Lorenz Florenz Friedrich von Crell (1744–1816), German chemist
Nicholas Crell or Nikolaus Krell (1551–1601), chancellor of the elector of Saxony
Samuel Crell or Samuel Crellius (1660–1747), Arian philosopher and theologian, pastor of the church of the Polish Brethren

See also
Krzysztof Crell-Spinowski (1622–1680), Arian theologian, pastor of the church of the Polish Brethren
Crell Moset, fictitious Cardassian exobiologist in "Nothing Human", the 102nd episode of Star Trek: Voyager
Carell
Carrel
Carrell
Crelly
Criella
Kurell
Querelle